West Virginia Route 68 is a north–south state highway in northwest West Virginia. The southern terminus of the route is at West Virginia Route 2 on the southern outskirts of Ravenswood. The northern terminus is at Interstate 77/WV 2 exit 179 northeast of Parkersburg. WV 2, concurrent with I-77 south of this location, departs the expressway and continues north on the same roadway as WV 68.

History

Before Interstate 77 was completed, State Route 2 followed the Ohio River (more or less) from St. Marys, south through Parkersburg, and on southward along the river to Ravenswood, and further toward Huntington.  When Interstate 77 was completed, State Route 2 was re-routed along Interstate 77 from the point where the two crossed, north of Parkersburg, to the point where Interstate 77 passes by Ravenswood.  At that point, State Route 2 left Interstate 77 and continued along its former route.  But the portion between where State Route 2 crossed Interstate 77 north of Parkersburg, and where it rejoined its original route in Ravenswood was established as State Route 68.  It passes through downtown Parkersburg, and continues along the old State Route 2 route south to Ravenswood. It is the only state route in West Virginia that shares a number with an interstate or U.S highway, due to the commissioning of Interstate 68 in 1991.

Major intersections

References

068
Transportation in Jackson County, West Virginia
Transportation in Wood County, West Virginia